W. Thomas Earl is a Canadian retired professional ice hockey player who played 347 games in the World Hockey Association.

Career
Earl debuted for the varsity team at Colgate University in 1967 and swiftly became the team's star. His time with the Red Raiders coincided with the team being a middling squad, preventing him from achieving any postseason success, however, Earl was able to shine during his time in Hamilton. As a junior he shattered the program record with 37 goals during the season, accounting for nearly a third of the team's total all season. He was named team captain for hit senior season and repeated his goal production while adding an additional 5 assists to finish with 62 points, another program record. When Earl was finished with his college career he held nearly all goal-scoring records for Colgate. In the years since almost all have been surpassed but he continues to hold the school record for game-winning goals with 18 overall and 10 in 1970 (as of 2020).

Earl continued his playing career immediately after Colgate's season ended in 1970, playing for the Kansas City Blues. He shifted from Wing to Center and played a more defensive-oriented game as a profession. The change paid off, however, and when the WHA was formed Earl became an inaugural member of the New England Whalers. Earl helped New England win the Avco Cup in 1973 and remained with the club until 1977. He finished his career after a short stint with the Rhode Island Reds.

Awards and honors

References

External links

1947 births
AHCA Division I men's ice hockey All-Americans
Canadian ice hockey centres
Colgate Raiders men's ice hockey players
Ice hockey people from Ontario
Kansas City Blues players
New England Whalers players
Living people
Rhode Island Reds players
Sportspeople from Niagara Falls, Ontario